Khyber Mail may refer to: 

Khyber Mail (passenger train), a train service in Pakistan
Khyber Mail (newspaper), an English language newspaper in Peshawar, Pakistan